Princess Shanti Singh of Nepal or Shanti Rajya Lakshmi Devi (November 20, 1940 – June 1, 2001) was a Nepalese princess and Rani of Bajhang after her marriage to  Kumar Deepak Jang Bahadur Singh, 60th Raja of Bajhang. The eldest child of King Mahendra of Nepal, she was one of the ten people who died in the Nepalese royal massacre.

Name Shanti means "Inner Peace".

Life

The eldest child of King Mahendra and his first wife Crown Princess Indra, Princess Shanti was educated at Loreto Convent, Darjeeling and Tribhuvan University.

Known as humble and hardworking, Princess Shanti was involved in different social welfare activities.

She married in Kathmandu, on 8 February 1965, Kumar Deepak Jang Bahadur Singh, 60th Raja of Bajhang (died in 1984 in London). They had three children, two sons and one daughter:

 Binod Singh, 61st Raja of Bajhang. 
 Pramod Singh.
 Chhaya Devi. She married Pradeep Bikram Rana, of Jajarkot.

In 1972, she founded the Nepal Leprosy Relief Association and went on to become its patron in 1994. A life member of the Nepalese Red Cross Society and the Family Planning Association, Princess Shanti also greatly contributed to the welfare of disabled people, becoming the president of the Disabled Welfare Fund Management Committee in 1987.

She was killed in the Nepalese royal massacre on June 1, 2001, along with nine other members of the Nepalese royal family.

Honours 
National honours
 Member of the Order of Three Divine Powers, 1st class.
 Member of the Order of the Gurkha Right Hand, 1st class (13 April 1972).
 Vishesh Sewalankar [Distinguished Service Medal].
 King Mahendra Coronation Medal (2 May 1956).
 King Birendra Coronation Medal (25 February 1975). 
 Commemorative Silver Jubilee Medal of King Birendra (31 January 1997).

Ancestry

References

1940 births
2001 deaths
2001 murders in Asia
20th-century Nepalese people
21st-century Nepalese people
20th-century Nepalese women
21st-century Nepalese women
Female murder victims
Nepalese princesses
Nepalese royalty
People murdered in Nepal
Murdered royalty
Nepalese murder victims
Tribhuvan University alumni
Members of the Order of Tri Shakti Patta, First Class
Members of the Order of Gorkha Dakshina Bahu, First Class
20th-century Nepalese nobility
Nepalese Hindus